The 2010 FIA GT1 Abu Dhabi round was an auto race held at the Yas Marina Circuit, Abu Dhabi, United Arab Emirates on 16–17 April 2010.  It served as the opening round of the 2010 FIA GT1 World Championship season, and the inaugural race of the FIA GT1 World Championship series.  It was the first sports car race designated by the Fédération Internationale de l'Automobile (FIA) as a world championship event since the 500 km of Magny-Cours held on 18 October 1992.  Swiss driver Romain Grosjean and German driver Thomas Mutsch won the championship race for Matech Competition Ford, ahead of the two Phoenix Racing Corvettes which completed the podium.  The Phoenix Corvette of Marc Hennerici and Andreas Zuber had won the qualifying race held earlier that day.  The UAE Touring Car Championship will serve as a support series for this event.

Qualifying
Qualifying began under the flood lights of Yas Marina Circuit, the entire session being held late on 16 April.  All 24 cars took to the track during the first 20-minute session, with Michael Krumm sitting on top of the field in the early minutes.  Frédéric Makowiecki was able to take over the pole position from the Nissan, the first driver to set a lap in the 2:07 range, quickly followed by the Vitaphone Maserati of Enrique Bernoldi less than a tenth of a second behind.  In the second half of the session Andreas Zuber was able to jump to the top in the Phoenix Corvette, beating Makowiecki's lap by just under a full second and the only driver to set a lap under 2:07.

Toward the end of the session, Matech driver Natacha Gachnang suffered an accident on the back straight of Yas Marina, running off the end of the straight and impacting the safety barriers head-on.  The session was stopped with just over two minutes remaining while safety crews attended to Gachnang, who was later airlifted from the circuit for medical attention and reported to have fractured her right leg.  A camera operator situated behind the safety barrier also sustained injuries when his television camera hit him in the face due to the impact.  The first session was delayed while Gachnang was attended to until it was announced approximately a half-hour later that repairs to the safety barriers could take up to three hours.  The FIA race director then cancelled not only the remainder of the first session, but the entire second and third sessions as well.  This awarded Zuber and his teammate Marc Hennerici pole position for the following day's qualifying race, while all other drivers remained in their positions due to the knock-out element of qualifying behind eliminated.

Qualifying result
For qualifying, Driver 1 participates in the first and third sessions while Driver 2 participates in only the second session.  However, due to the cancellation of Sessions 2 and 3 for this event, only the Driver 1 participated in this qualifying session.

Races

Qualifying race
The first FIA GT1 World Championship race began in the afternoon, with pole sitter Marc Hennerici leading the field to the green flag from a rolling start.  Entering the first left-hander Miguel Ramos in the No.2 Vitaphone Maserati attempted to secure second place but lost the rear of the car under braking and tapped the rear end of Hennerici's Corvette as the car spun across the course.  While attempting to regain control, the rear of the Maserati was hit by the No.7 Aston Martin of Tomáš Enge, who ricocheted into the No.12 Mad-Croc Corvette of Pertti Kuismanen.  All three cars would retire from the race due to the accident damage.  Further into the first lap, the No.9 Hexis Aston Martin spun on his own, leaving driver Philippe Dumas at the tail of the field.  These incidents forced the stewards to deploy the safety car as Hennerici lead the field ahead of the No.11 Mad-Croc Corvette of Alex Müller, the No.1 Vitaphone Maserati of Andrea Bertolini, the No.24 Reiter Lamborghini of Christopher Haase, and the No.5 Matech Ford of Romain Grosjean, who gained nine positions on the opening lap.

After two laps under the safety car, the race was restarted and Hennerici continued as the race leader.  Grosjean began to climb his way through the field, passing Kox's Lamborghini on Lap 5, then Piccini's Maserati two laps later, then was able to take second place from Müller's Corvette before the end of Lap 8.  The pit window opened on Lap 10, with Hennerici forfeiting the lead to Grosjean to take the first opportunity to pit and change to driver Andreas Zuber.  Three laps later both the Matech Ford and Mad-Croc Corvette came in for their pit stops, but the Corvette had a slower pit stop and fell to seventh place.  After the ten-minute pit window closed, Thomas Mutsch took over the second-place Matech Ford while Michael Bartels held third in the Vitaphone Maserati.  Neither driver was able to catch the leading Corvette of Zuber, while Xavier Maassen in the No.11 Mad-Croc Corvette was able to climb back to fourth position before the car's engine failed three laps from the finish.  Zuber eventually took the race win by just over two seconds ahead of Mutsch after having led by as much as ten seconds earlier in the race.  Bartels completed the podium and final points earning position for the qualifying race.

Race result

Championship race

Race result

References

External links
 FIA GT1 World Championship – Yas Marina GT1 race in Abu Dhabi

Abu Dhabi
Fia Gt1 Abu Dhabi Round, 2010
Motorsport competitions in the United Arab Emirates